The Nanterre massacre was a mass murder that occurred on 27 March 2002, in  Nanterre, France. Gunman Richard Durn opened fire at the end of a town council meeting, resulting in the deaths of eight councillors and the injury of nineteen others. Durn committed suicide the following day, by leaping from a police station window during questioning.

Shooting
At approximately 1:15 a.m. (CEST), at the Nanterre town hall, following a meeting of the municipal council chaired by Mayor Jacqueline Fraysse, Richard Durn rose from his seat, removed firearms previously hidden under his jacket, and opened fire. Durn killed eight councilors and injured 19 others; 14 critically, before being overpowered by Gerard Perreau-Bezouille and other councilors. Once overpowered, Durn began shouting, "Kill me!"

Following events
Durn was interrogated at the police station at 36 Quai des Orfèvres, Paris, on 28 March. After confessing, Durn committed suicide by throwing himself from the fourth floor window.

Durn had sent a letter to a friend in which he explained his plan: "Because I have by my own will become a kind of living-dead, I have decided to end it all by killing a small local elite which is the symbol of, and who are the leaders and decision makers in, a city that I have always detested." He explained that he intended to kill the mayor, "and then as many people as possible [...] I will become a serial killer, a mad killer. Why? Because I am frustrated and I do not want to die alone, because I have had a shitty life. I want to feel powerful and free just once."

Perpetrator

The perpetrator in the shootings was Richard Durn, 33, who was originally from Slovenia. He held a master's degree in political science and a degree in history and participated in humanitarian actions in Yugoslavia, as well as various anti-globalization events. According to the police, Durn was an environmental activist, and a former member of the Socialist Party before joining the Greens. He was also a member of the Ligue des droits de l'homme.

He acquired his Glock and  Smith & Wesson weapons to practice sport shooting. For this he had obtained the necessary prefectural authorizations. However, at the material time, he was no longer a member of a shooting club and his licenses had expired.

Aftermath
An official tribute was paid to the victims on 2 April, in the presence of President Jacques Chirac, Prime Minister Lionel Jospin and Interior Minister Daniel Vaillant.

The massacre was discussed by French philosopher Bernard Stiegler in his book, Acting Out. Stiegler argues that Durn's feeling of non-existence was symptomatic of a society which tends to destroy the love of oneself and others, and that Durn's actions represent a "hyper-diachronic" acting out which is made possible by this feeling of non-existence.

The event which takes place in the middle of the campaign of the  presidential election of 2002. Beyond the unanimous tributes of the political class, a statement by Jacques Chirac on insecurity appears to his opponents as an attempt at political recovery condemned by the PS. The campaign resumes its course but is again marked by the theme of insecurity by the Paul Voise case. Ten years later, the media draw the parallel with the Toulouse and Montauban shootings.

Also, many right-wing polemical voices rose to demand the dissolution of the political party to which Richard Durn belonged, which will have no effect. Three days before the first round of the presidential election, Prime Minister Lionel Jospin proposed 9 measures to tighten up the arms legislation. Following the example of Tony Blair in 1998, one of the measures planned was to confiscate without compensation all handguns with central percussion legally held by sport shooters. Reactions were numerous, notably via the Internet, and contributed to the failure of candidate Jospin in the first round. The sports shooters noted the State's shortcomings and its inability to operate its administrative monitoring system for weapons subject to authorization or declaration. The Prime Minister nevertheless tried to pass his text urgently between the two rounds. This will be rejected by the Constitutional Council on a technical point, a "consultation" meeting had not had time to be organized. With also the attempted attack by Maxime Brunerie against President Jacques Chirac on 14 July 2002, the State nevertheless tightened its legislation on the practice of sport shooting with the  law for internal security (LSI) of 18 March 2003. A medical certificate is now required to apply for possession of a firearm. The psychiatric history is checked with the Departmental Directorate of Health and Social Affairs (DDASS). The prefectural services have been instructed to react when the expiry date of the authorizations has passed. The .22 LR caliber rifles classified in 7th category cease to be sold over the counter. Their acquisition is limited to holders of a hunting license or a shooting license.

See also
List of massacres in France

References

Footnotes 
 

Nanterre
21st-century mass murder in France
Crime in Île-de-France
Deaths by firearm in France
March 2002 crimes
March 2002 events in France
Massacres in 2002
Mass shootings in France
Massacres in France
Murder–suicides in France
Suicides by jumping in France
2002 mass shootings in Europe